Inbox Business Technologies Limited (Inbox) is a public unlisted information technology (IT) company headquartered in Karachi, Pakistan.
Inbox has regional offices in Lahore, Islamabad and Rawalpindi.
Originally started in 2001 as a PC assembler, Inbox emerged to a system integrator and has evolved in the last two decades to a managed service provider.  Inbox is one of Pakistan’s largest IT companies (in terms of domestic revenue).

The company has offices in 50 cities across Pakistan, over 1500 employees. Its customers include companies from the public, commercial, financial and telecom sector. Inbox was in 2016 recognized by the Pakistan Software Export Board (PSEB) as the largest IT Company of Pakistan in terms of domestic revenue.  The company, has in 2021 a consolidated annual revenue of over PKR 5,500,000,000 (US$ 35 million).

History 
In 2001, Inbox started as the first local assembler of computers in Pakistan by Ghias Khan and two friends. In 2005, the majority stakes (51%) were acquired through companies with common directorship and ownership of Hussain Dawood and family and is since then associate with the Dawood Hercules Corporation, one of the largest conglomerates in Pakistan. The company shifted from computer assemblers to system integrators in 2007, and partnered with global companies like Huawei, Oracle, and Microsoft. In 2009, the company started providing managed services and introduced digital services in 2014, offering customized processes, managed services infrastructure, and disruptive technology alliances.

Business fields 
Inbox provides essential IT services, like backend work, and all sorts of technology-oriented solutions such as IT service management, IT operations management, remote management and digital content management. It also provides everything digital, from cyber security to asset management. The company has two Security Operating Centers, one in Islamabad and the other in Karachi. Inbox works with the federal government, provincial governments, and city governments to establishing smart governance, including Internet of Things (IoT), Urban Security and Intelligent Transportation System.

Prominent Projects 
NTC Cloud Data Centre: Inbox established Pakistan first public cloud based data centre for the National Telecommunication Corporation. The data center is providing the facilities to the government bodies with different services in data communication.

MVR Smart Cards: Inbox assisted an Excise and Taxation Department Punjab and Sindh initiative to replace traditional vehicle registration books with new digital smart cards. The NFC-equipped cards are being issued for security and facilitation of the citizens making vehicle registry verification process much easier.

Grey Traffic Monitoring System: Inbox deployed a technical facility on internet gateways nationwide, to curb illegal international traffic, to strengthen the regulator to enforce OTT regulatory framework, and to provide basis for national cyber security and content filtering.
 
Urban Mass Transit: Inbox collaborated with a Turkish company to develop an IT system for the public transportation system, including the electronic fare collection and integration, bus scheduling, ticketing and a feedback systems. This includes the Lahore Metro Bus as well as Pakistan Metro bus projects.
 
Connected Agriculture Platform Punjab (CAPP): Inbox partnered with Telenor Pakistan to enable a platform aimed improving access to information, financial resources, and market besides enhancing supply chain efficiency.

References 

Business process outsourcing companies 
Companies based in Karachi
Information technology in Pakistan
Pakistani brands
Pakistani companies established in 2001
Software companies established in 2001
Software companies of Pakistan